John Clark Stadium (formerly John Clark Field) is a 14,224-capacity multi-use high school stadium in Plano, Texas. Mostly used for high school football and soccer, the stadium was built in 1977 for $2.73 million and is owned by the Plano Independent School District. It is the home stadium of Plano Senior High School and Plano West Senior High School.

Namesake
The stadium was named after Coach John Clark, the main coach of Plano High School from Jacksonville. As the main coach of the Plano Wildcats, Clark helped the football team win two state championships and nine district championships. Clark served as the Plano ISD Athletics Director for 17 years. During that time he received many awards including the first inductee into the Plano Athletics Hall of Honor, Texas High School Coaches Association Hall of Honor, the Texas High School Athletic Directors' Hall of Honor and the Texas Sports High School Football Hall of Fame.

External links
 Information at Texas Bob - Football stadiums
 A Texas Football Legend from Jacksonville
 Clark Stadium Landing Page

American football venues in the Dallas–Fort Worth metroplex
High school football venues in Texas
Soccer venues in Texas
Buildings and structures in Plano, Texas
Sports venues completed in 1977
Buildings and structures in Collin County, Texas
Defunct National Premier Soccer League stadiums
Sports in Collin County, Texas